The Concert Noble is a ballroom built by Hendrik Beyaert in Brussels, Belgium. It is located in the Leopold Quarter, at 82, /, between Rue Belliard/Belliardstraat and Rue de la Loi/Wetsraat.

History
The Concert Noble Society was founded in 1785 by Maria Christina, Duchess of Teschen, and her husband Albert Casimir, Duke of Teschen, whose portraits hang in the building. The current building was constructed under King Leopold II in 1873. The ornate rooms are decorated with several portraits of the Belgian royal family. The rooms can still be rented for private social events. In the final decades of the 20th century, the rooms were listed as protected heritage and restored in their original style.

Use
The rooms are famous as the setting for balls attended by the Belgian, Austrian and Hungarian nobility. The Belgian elite often prefer to hold their society events in this old ball room. The rooms are also sometimes used for international meetings. In 2016, then-United States Secretary of State John Kerry used the rooms for a lecture.

Website

References

Ballrooms
Protected heritage sites in Brussels
Buildings and structures in Brussels